Linares is a city located in the Andalusian province of Jaén, Spain. It is considered the second-most important city in that province and had a population of 56,525 in the most recent census (2021).

Overview

Location

Located in the Central-Western part of the province, the city of Linares is the second-biggest city in the province after the capital, Jaén. It is also the commercial capital of Sierra Morena, as well as the referential city in the surrounding areas.

Geography

The city term is orientated in a NE-SW direction, giving the transition in altitude decreasing between the higher northern area of Sierra Morena; being Paño Pico (552 m) the highest area of the municipal term; and the lowest area, the Guadalimar Valley in the South-Western limit, with an altitude of (318 m).

Climate

The city has a Mediterranean Climate (Csa) clearly divided into four seasons, with hot and dry summers where the temperatures can reach frequently 40 °C, two transitioning seasons, spring and autumn, that concentrate most of the annual rainfall; and a moderate winter, with temperatures that can sometimes drop below 0 °C during night time, and occasional rainfall.

The annual medium temperature oscillates between 8 °C in January and the 27 °C in July. The daily variations can reach 20 °C.

The annual rainfall is about 500 mm, with frequent fluctuations along the years. Snow is rarely spotted in the city and storms, that are quite frequent especially around summer and early autumn, can cause hail and big amounts of rainfall in shorts periods.

Transport

The city is well connected to the rest of Spain. The (A-32) highway, NIV Linares-Albacete, also traverses through the city.

There is a railroad station at Linares-Baeza, with lines connecting Madrid and Cádiz, and Madrid-Granada-Almería. The railroad has also a cargo deck.

Near to Linares is the ancient town of Castulo, which dates to antiquity and earned much of its revenue from the lead mines located there. It was at Castulo that Carthaginian general Hannibal married the local Iberian princess Himilce on the eve of the Second Punic War.

The city has also a recent university campus known as the Scientific-Technological Campus, opened in 2015, that offers a wide range of engineering studies, belonging to the University of Jaén since 1 July 1993.

Linares is also the place where the annual Linares chess tournament was held.

History
Around the middle of the nineteenth century Linares became an important mining center with lead mines nearby.  The smelting of lead, the manufacture of lead sheets and pipes, and the production of by-product silver from the lead ores led to a significant population increase.  The 6,000 inhabitants in 1849 became 36,000 in 1877.  This commercial and industrial growth brought the concession of the title of city in 1875.

Economy

The lead mines of Linares were in almost interrupted activity from pre-Roman times until the 1990s. There were also lead smelters and gunpowder, dynamite and rope factories as auxiliary to the mining industry. Currently, the mines of Linares are protected as cultural heritage.

Santana Motor, the former producer of all-terrain vehicles for the Spanish Army which was recently shut down due to the economic recession.  There is also a factory producing trains (CAF), another one producing components for wind turbines (Grupo Daniel Alonso y Gamesa), and a beet sugar plant (Azucareras Reunidas de Jaen S.A.), which now produces biodiesel from colza oil, palm oil, soybeans, and sunflower oil.

Sport
Historically the town was always represented by a professional football team, however as the teams folded new ones came to replace them, producing a long timeliness of continuous clubs since 1909: SG Linarense (1909–20), Linares FC (1920–29), Gimnástica Linarense (1929–31), Linares Deportivo (1940–46), Atlético Linares (1946–48), CD Linares (1952–64), Linares CF (1961–90), CD Linares (1990–2009) and Linares Deportivo (2009–present).

Personalities
The bull ring in Linares is famous for the death in 1947 of bullfighter Manolete (Manuel Rodríguez Sánchez).  On 28 August every year, people place flowers on his statue in Linares.  Manolete's death is remembered in the ring by putting a bunch of roses in the place where he fell.

Linares is the birthplace of classical guitarist Andrés Segovia, singer Raphael and the hometown of jazz vocalist Virginia Maestro and Blessed Manuel Lozano Garrido, who was beatified on Saturday 12 June 2010 in Linares. Also, it is the hometown of the writer Fanny Rubio

International relations

Twin towns – Sister cities
Linares is twinned with:
 Linares, Nuevo León, Mexico
 Linares, Maule, Chile
 Linares, Nariño, Colombia
 Tomaszów Mazowiecki, Poland
 Castres, France

Notes and references

External links 

 
 All terrain Santana Motor Company 
 Cultural and tourism services in the area
 Culture and theatre in Linares
 Culture tourism information and photogalery 

 
Municipalities in the Province of Jaén (Spain)